Great Torrington (often abbreviated to Torrington, though the villages of Little Torrington and Black Torrington are situated in the same region) is a market town in Devon, England. Parts of it are sited on high ground with steep drops down to the River Torridge below, with the lower-lying parts of the town prone to occasional flooding. Torrington is in the centre of Tarka Country, a landscape captured by Henry Williamson in his novel Tarka the Otter in 1927. Great Torrington has one of the most active volunteering communities in the United Kingdom.

In July 2019, Great Torrington was reported to be the healthiest place to live in Britain. Researchers from the University of Liverpool found that the area had low levels of pollution, good access to green space and health services, along with few retail outlets.

History 

There were Iron Age and medieval castles and forts in Torrington, located on the Castle Hill.

Great Torrington had strategic significance in the English Civil War. In the Battle of Torrington (1646), the Parliamentarians, led by Sir Thomas Fairfax, swept into the town and defeated Lord Hopton's forces. This marked the end of Royalist resistance in the West Country. Today the town is recognised as an important heritage centre for the history of the 17th century, and its people can often be seen dressed in costume for historical re-enactments, festivals and celebrations. An interactive Civil War Experience, "Torrington 1646", marks the town's historically important role.
The Torrington jail was not big enough for more than one man so the Royalists kept all the Parliamentarian prisoners in the church. Then 70 barrels of gunpowder exploded and killed everyone held captive and many of their captors. Great Torrington Town Hall, a neoclassical style building, was completed in 1861.

Railway

The branch line from Barnstaple to Bideford was extended to Great Torrington in July 1872 by the London and South Western Railway, which built a railway station and locomotive depot in the town. The station was always named 'Torrington', not 'Great Torrington'.

The locomotive depot was closed in 1959 and the line was closed to passenger traffic as part of the Beeching Axe. It was closed to goods traffic in 1984. At the site of the old station there is still in 2015 a pub named The Puffing Billy. A few small sections of track remain, but most has been removed and replaced with a combined foot and cycle path as part of the Tarka Trail. The Tarka Trail continues to Bideford, Barnstaple and on to Braunton in one direction, and to Meeth in the other, making  of traffic free trail.

Descent of the manor
The manor of Great Torrington was granted by Queen Mary to James Basset (1526–1558), MP, a younger son of Sir John Bassett (1462 – 31 Jan 1529) of Umberleigh. James's son Philip Bassett sold it to Sir John Fortescue (c.1531–1607) of Ponsbourne, near Hatfield, Hertfordshire, the eldest son of Sir Adrian Fortescue (1476–1539), descended from Richard Fortescue, younger brother of Henry Fortescue (fl. 1426), Lord Chief Justice of the Common Pleas in Ireland and of Sir John Fortescue (ca. 1394–1480), Lord Chief Justice of England and Wales. Denys Rolle (1614–1638) of nearby Stevenstone in the parish of St Giles in the Wood, acquired the lordship of the manor of Great Torrington from his descendant Sir William Fortescue. Denys Rolle (1614–1638) founded the Bluecoat School in Torrington The fountain and clock in the square were given in 1870 by Mark Rolle (1835–1907) A number of family portraits were given to the town by the heirs of Mark Rolle, some of which remain on display in the Great Torrington Town Hall, some of the more valuable ones having been sold, including a portrait of John Rolle Walter (c.1714–1779) by Pompeo Batoni.

Torrington Common 

Torrington Common is an area of common land which surrounds the town on all but the eastern side. The common is administered by a body called "The Commons Conservators". The landscape features a variety of habitats, flora and fauna.

History of the common 

An "area of waste called the Common" was donated to the town in 1194 by the feudal baron of Great Torrington. In 1889, the rights to this land were transferred by an act of parliament to an elected "Committee of Conservators". The bill was subject of a local poll, as the document now at Devon Record Office evidences:

The Rolle Estate was the largest landowner in Devon, having been built up by the Rolle family of Stevenstone. Since 2 October 1889 the Conservators have met regularly to fulfil their remit to manage the land. Early activity was mainly concerned with control over the grazing and quarrying of the common, but since 1980 grazing has stopped and instead various techniques have taken its place to prevent the common from reverting to scrub and woodland. There has been building development on the commons which locals oppose.

Features of the common 
 Taddiport Bridge and Rothern Bridge: Prior to the opening of the Town Mills Bridge, these were the only local crossings of the River Torridge.
 Rolle Road: This is the site of the Rolle Canal which opened in 1827 to help transport clay, lime and other commodities between the boats on the tidal river at Landcross and the lime kilns, clay pits and farms around Torrington. It ran through common land, but was closed in 1871. Later, it was filled in to create a toll road across the Common.
 Waterloo Monument: A stone obelisk erected in 1818 by "the ladies of Great Torrington" to commemorate the Battle of Waterloo.

Visitor attractions 

Attractions in Great Torrington include:
 Dartington Crystal, Factory, Visitors Centre, Glass Shop and Restaurant of Dartington Crystal – the biggest employer in the town and the only major working glass factory in the UK

 Rosemoor Garden, a collection of gardens, woodlands and parkland owned by the Royal Horticultural Society
 The Victorian Torrington Pannier Market with a glass roof, restored in 1999
 Great Torrington Heritage Museum, located next to the Pannier Market
 St Michael and All Angels, a Church of England parish church whose churchyard includes a mound said to contain the remains of 60 Civil War Royalist prisoners
 The Plough Arts Centre, a small theatre, cinema and gallery
 Great Torrington also has a selection of pubs selling food and a selection of real ales. These include The Torridge Inn, The Black Horse, Torrington Arms, Cavalier, Globe and Royal Exchange. Torrington had a small brewery called Clearwater Brewery with its "Cavalier" and "1646" brands.

Employment 

Torrington has long been a factory town. In the nineteenth century it was a centre of the glove making industry. The major employer today is Dartington Crystal, but the shops in the town centre also provide a source of employment. Most of the shops are locally owned; however, there are branches of The Co-operative Food, Lidl, Spar and Lloyds Pharmacy. Large factories have deserted the town in recent years including the meat factory after a fire, and the milk factory which also caught fire has moved its production elsewhere. Various converted and purpose-built care homes in the town also provide a significant source of employment.

In 2006, Tesco sought to open a  store in the town; however, this was opposed by many locals and the planning application was rejected.

Sports and culture 
Local radio is provided by The Voice, a station based in nearby Barnstaple that broadcasts across North Devon on FM and DAB. Most of the content on the station is locally produced.

The regional radio station Heart West can be received in the town on FM and DAB. The station is a part of the Heart network and broadcasts across the South West of England. Most of the shows broadcast are national shows from the Heart London studios, rather than region-specific ones. Region-specific content includes the weekday Drivetime show produced in Bristol, and local advertising.

The local newspaper is the North Devon Journal also based in Barnstaple. The Western Morning News is a regional paper widely available. Most households receive a copy of the North Devon Gazette every week. The Crier is the community newsletter and diary delivered free to most households in the town and surrounding area for ten months of the year.

Torrington's football teams are Torrington F.C. and Torridgeside A.F.C. There are also rugby, netball, tennis and swimming teams. Great Torrington Bowling Club, established in 1645, is the third oldest bowling club in England.

Great Torrington is twinned with the French port town of Roscoff, situated in northern Brittany. Roscoff is served by the Brittany Ferries service from Plymouth and is a popular destination for school trips from the area.

Transport
Torrington is served by 43 local bus services mostly operated by Stagecoach South West. Some only operate one way and a number are weekly only service.

Belle Vue Airfield is a single runway airfield about 2.5 miles north east of Great Torrington in North Devon, England. It is for private aviation only, operating restricted flying hours and is frequented by Microlight and hang-gliding clubs. The 580-metre (1,902-foot) runway is grass.
	

There is a summertime-only ferry service based at Bideford Harbour (7 miles away) to and from Lundy Island.

Torrington has no direct train services; Umberleigh (8 miles away) is served by the Tarka Line from Exeter St David's. Bus connections are available to and from Barnstaple station (11 miles away).

Notable people
 Thomas Fowler (1777–1843), inventor
 Elizabeth Johnson (1721–1800), pamphleteer
 William Johnson Cory (1823–1892), educator and poet
 William Keble Martin (1877–1969), reverend, botanist and author
William Sandford (1841–1932), pioneer of the Australian iron and steel industry.

See also
 Great Torrington School

References

External links 
 Great Torrington Town Council
www.OneGreatTorrington.uk

 
Former manors in Devon
Market towns in Devon
Towns in Devon
Torridge District